Estadio Santiago Bueras is a multi-use stadium in Maipu, Chile.  It is currently used mostly for football matches and is the home stadium of Santiago Morning.  The stadium holds 3,400 people and was built in 1984.

References

Santiago Bueras
Santiago Bueras
Sports venues completed in 1984
1984 establishments in Chile